Vårby gård is a station in the Stockholm metro in the Vårby district of Huddinge Municipality. The station was opened on 1 October 1972 as part of the extension from Vårberg to Fittja.

As part of Art in the Stockholm metro project, the station features a Flora mural, created by Rolf Bergström 1999.

On 7 January 2018, an explosion just outside the station killed a man in his 60s and injured his wife. The man is believed to have picked up a suspected hand grenade from the ground. There was no evidence it was related to terrorism or that the couple were targeted.

References

Red line (Stockholm metro) stations
Railway stations opened in 1972